C. R. Basappa (13 April 1913 - 29 January 1991) was an Indian politician and he served as 3 times Member of Parliament (MP), represented the Tiptur in Lok Sabha the lower house of the Parliament of India. Secy. Congress Party in Parliament.

Early life and background 
C. R. Basappa was born on 13 April 1913 in Chikanaya Kanhalli of Mysore (in present-day Chikanaya Kanhalli, Karnataka). He obtained his B.A., B.T., LL.B. degree from Government High School Tumkur, Maharaja's College, Mysore and Government Law College, Bombay.

Personal life 
C. R. Basappa married  C. R. Puttathayamma in 1937 and couple has 3 sons and 1 daughter.

Position held

Death 
C. R. Basappa died on 29 January 1991 at the age of 77.

References

External links
Official biographical sketch in Parliament of India website

1913 births
India MPs 1952–1957
India MPs 1957–1962
India MPs 1962–1967
Lok Sabha members from Karnataka
Indian National Congress politicians
Indian National Congress politicians from Karnataka
1991 deaths